Chassignolles may refer to the following places in France:

Chassignolles, Indre, a commune in the Indre department 
Chassignolles, Haute-Loire, a commune in the Haute-Loire department